Goldenweiser is a surname. People with that name include:

 Alexander Goldenweiser (composer) (1875-1961), Russian pianist, teacher and composer
 Alexander Goldenweiser (anthropologist) (1880-1940), Russian-born U.S. anthropologist and sociologist
 Emanuel Goldenweiser (1883-1953), Russian-born American economist

See also